Llano Grande is a corregimiento in La Pintada District, Coclé Province, Panama. Its population as of 1990 was 4,816; its population as of 2000 was 6,026.

References

Corregimientos of Coclé Province